The Church and Watt Street Terrace Group is a heritage-listed precinct along Church and Watt Streets, Newcastle, City of Newcastle, New South Wales, Australia. It was added to the New South Wales State Heritage Register on 2 April 1999.

Description 

The precinct includes four neighbouring sites listed as constituent elements:

Heritage listing 
The Church and Watt Street Terrace Group was listed on the New South Wales State Heritage Register on 2 April 1999.

See also

References

Attribution 

New South Wales State Heritage Register
Newcastle, New South Wales
Terraced houses in New South Wales
Articles incorporating text from the New South Wales State Heritage Register